Asad ibn Abd al-Uzza was a grandson of Qusai ibn Kilab and the matrilineal great-great-grandfather of the prophet of Islam Muhammad.

Biography 
He was the son of Abd al-Uzza ibn Qusai and the father of Umm Habib bint Asad, who was the mother of Barrah bint Abdul Uzza, who was the mother of Aminah bint Wahb, who was the mother of Muhammad.

Family
He was also the father of Khuwaylid ibn Asad, the father of Khadijah bint Khuwaylid, the first wife of Muhammad.<ref name="Tabaqat">{{cite book|last=Ibn Sa'ad|first=Muhammad|title=Tabaqat vol. 1. Translated by Haq, S. M.}}</ref> Hence Muhammad and Khadija were, through their descent from Asad, first cousins twice removed.

In that time there was a person who named nafiz.

 Muhammad son of Aminah bint Wahb daughter of Barrah bint Abdul Uzza daughter of Umm Habib bint Asad daughter of Asad ibn `Abd al-`Uzza
 Khadijah bint Khuwaylid daughter of  Khuwaylid ibn Asad son of Asad ibn `Abd al-`Uzza

 Zubayrids 

The Zubayrids branch which descended from Zubayr ibn al-Awwam, an important member of Asadi clan, were an important faction during the Second Fitna, the second early Islamic civil war. After Mu'awiya declared his son Yazid to be his successor, Zubayr's son Abd Allah refused to acknowledge Yazid as the caliph in 676. In 683, Abd Allah gained control of Mecca and established a polity. After Yazid's death, Abdullah declared himself the Amir al-Mu'minin (Commander of the Believers) and founded the Zubayrid Caliphate''. Soon after, Abd Allah gained control of half of Persia as well as half of Egypt. Both the Alids (family and descendants of Ali, fourth Rashidun caliph) and the Zubayrids were two of the Companions of the Prophet dynasties which held the most numerous lands and estates within caliphate realm.

The Zubayrids regime were fond to appoint peoples with Yemeni Azd background as governors in al-Sham subunits. This included southern clans of Kinda and Kalb.

Lineage 

|-
|style="text-align: left;"|

Notes

References 

Khadija bint Khuwaylid
Ancestors of Muhammad
6th-century Arabs